Shel Trapp (1935 – October 18, 2010) was a community organizer based in Chicago, co-founder of National People's Action (along with Gale Cincotta), and author of several books and pamphlets on community organizing. Trapp and Cincotta are widely credited with writing the Community Reinvestment Act (CRA). Trapp has also been responsible for training hundreds of community organizers throughout the United States through the National Training and Information Center. He retired in 2000 and died of pneumonia in October 2010.

References

Bibliography
John Koval, Larry Bennett, Michael Bennett, and Fassil Demissie,  The New Chicago: A Social and Cultural Analysis (Temple University Press, 2006). 
Rinku Sen and Kim Klein, Stir It Up: Lessons in Community Organizing and Advocacy (Jossey-Bass, 2003). 
David Walls, The Activist's Almanac: The Concerned Citizen's Guide to the Leading Advocacy Organizations in America (Simon & Schuster/Fireside, 1993).

Pamphlets by Trapp
Basics of Organizing. Chicago: National Training and Information Center, 1986.
Blessed Be the Fighters: Reflections on Organizing . . . Collected Essays. Chicago: National Training and Information Center, 1986.
Dynamics of Organizing. Chicago: National Training and Information Center, 1976.

External links
Video interview with Shel Trapp about his beginnings in organizing
NPA website
Video interview with Shel Trapp on the origins of the "bank-in"

American community activists
1935 births
2010 deaths
Deaths from pneumonia in Illinois